(died 1180), also known as Ōba Saburō Kagechika, was a samurai of Japan's Heian period. The third son of Oba Kageyoshi, he fought alongside his father, against the Minamoto Clan, in the Hōgen Rebellion of 1156. 

Facing off against Minamoto no Tametomo during the Hōgen Rebellion, Kagechika is credited with challenging Tametomo, crying 
Lord Hachiman! During the Three Years War, in the attack upon the stockade at Kanazawa, Kamakura Gongorō Kagemasa, then only sixteen years of age, went to the front of the battle, and when his left eye was pierced by an arrow through his visor he loosed a shaft in return and took his assailant. I am the youngest descendant of that Gongorō, Oba Heita Kageyoshi's son, Oba Saburō Kagechika. Come on and fight!

Many years later, during the Genpei War, he led Taira clan forces to a victory against Minamoto no Yoritomo at Ishibashiyama in September 1180.  However, two months later, Oba submitted to Yoritomo and was decapitated.

References
Frederic, Louis (2002). "Japan Encyclopedia." Cambridge, Massachusetts: Harvard University Press.

See also 
The Tale of the Heike
Sasaki Yoshikiyo

Samurai
1180 deaths
Year of birth unknown